The International Summer School Marktoberdorf is an annual two-week summer school for international computer science and mathematics postgraduate students and other young researchers, held annually since 1970 in Marktoberdorf, near Munich in southern Germany.  Students are accommodated in the boarding house of a local high school, Gymnasium Marktoberdorf. Proceedings are published when appropriate.

Status
This is a summer school for theoretical computer science researchers, with some directors/co-directors who are Turing Award winners (the nearest equivalent to the Nobel Prize in computer science).

The summer school is supported as an Advanced Study Institute of the NATO Science for Peace and Security Program. It is administered by the Faculty of Informatics at the Technical University of Munich.

Directors

Past academic directors and co-directors include:

Manfred Broy
Robert Lee Constable
Javier Esparza
Orna Grumberg
David Harel
Tony Hoare*
Orna Kupferman
Tobias Nipkow
Doron Peled
Amir Pnueli*
Alexander Pretschner
Peter Müller
Shmuel Sagiv
Helmut Schwichtenberg
Helmut Seidl
Stanley S. Wainer

* Turing Award winners.

References

External links
 

1970 establishments in Germany
Recurring events established in 1970
August events
Marktoberdorf
Computer science conferences
Computer science education
Theoretical computer science
Annual events in Germany
Events in West Germany
NATO
Technical University of Munich
Education in Bavaria